Newlyn is a small, rural town in the Shire of Hepburn, in west-central Victoria, Australia.
It is 452 metres above sea level. It is located on the Midland Highway. Newlyn North is 2 kilometres away.

History and buildings 
Newlyn was a suitable farming area for Creswick miners as easily-won alluvial gold lessened during the mid-1850s. Many miners were Methodist, and some were from Cornwall, England. The town of Newlyn in the Central Highlands between Ballarat and Daylesford is considered to be named after the village of St. Newlyn East in Cornwall.

Newlyn has a general store, a hotel, a hall and a primary school. The Post Office opened on 10 September 1864. A mechanics' institute was opened in 1886, which became the site of the Newlyn Antiques and Nursery. In 1890, Newlyn had two hotels, two churches, a free library (which would also become part of the Nursery) and a large produce store. In 1915 Newlyn Railway Station PO was renamed Newlyn, and Newlyn was renamed Newlyn North. 
Newlyn Station was on a branch line of the Mildura railway line, from North Creswick to Daylesford, which was closed in 1953.

The town has an Australian Rules football team competing in the Central Highlands Football League. 

The Coronet City-Newlyn Cricket Club is the town's cricket club. During the 1950s and 60s, the area was in the Newlyn Cricket Association, but faced demise as sides joined other associations and cricket became more popular in Ballarat. They won a premiership in the 90s but were in recess for two years. Its president is Craig Slater, who has been involved in the club for around forty-five years, and its captain is Ben Dimond. The Newlyn Cricket Club used to play in the Daylesford Cricket Association before it folded. It survived by becoming part of the Coronet City Cricket Club and joining the Ballarat Cricket Association in 2012.

In January 2022, Newlyn was heavily impacted by a local storm.

Newlyn Antiques and Cottage Garden Nursery 
Newlyn Antiques and Cottage Garden Nursery was owned by John and Faye Hungerford, who worked there for twenty-three years after buying the building in 1996. The site is composed of a number of historical buildings, including a cottage built in 1853, and a restorer’s shed and hall established in 1886, which housed the Mechanics' Institute and Free Library. The couple retired in 2019 and Faye died in May 2022.

Newlyn Primary School 
Newlyn Primary School was established in 1858, and has around twenty children enrolled. It faced closure from underfunding and lack of enrollment. Since 2018, Samantha Vella has been the school principal after moving from a larger school in Melbourne. The school, a preserved brick building, has a garden, a kitchen and several animals, as well as a 1930s piano. It had eight students in 2014, six in 2018, and eighteen in 2021. The school's operations, such as maintenance of the grounds, are assisted by volunteering families.

In October 2022, the school bell was stolen from the grounds. Built in Castlemaine, Victoria by J.W Horwood of the Albion foundry in the late 1880s, it was an iron bell which hung from a metal tower, which students would take turns to ring at the end of every break. The theft received coverage on local news and Vella urged the thieves to return the bell, saying that "to lose that little bit of history is so significant."

References

Sources 

 
 

Mining towns in Victoria (Australia)
Towns in Victoria (Australia)